William Francis Ray (born March 2, 1854) was a Republican politician from Franklin, Massachusetts.

Personal life
Ray was born March 2, 1854, in Franklin. He attended the Franklin Public Schools, Dean Academy, and Brown University.

Career
Ray was a woollen manufacturer.

Political life
Dean was elected to the School Committee and the Board of Selectmen in Franklin. As a member of the Massachusetts House of Representatives, he served on the committees on public service, manufactures, and the child labor commission.

As a Massachusetts State Senator is 1892, Ray represented the Second Norfolk District, which consisted of Avon, Bellingham, Brookline, Dedham, Dover, Foxborough, Franklin, Medfield, Medway, Millis, Needham, Norfolk, Norwood, Sharon, Stoughton, Walpole, Wellesley, and Wrentham. He was chairman of committee on constitutional amendments and a member ofcommittee on railroads.

References

Republican Party Massachusetts state senators
Republican Party members of the Massachusetts House of Representatives
People from Franklin, Massachusetts
Brown University alumni
1854 births
Year of death missing